Code 3 is an American crime drama that aired in syndication in 1956 and 1957. The stories were all based on actual files of the Los Angeles sheriff's office.

Stories were presented from the viewpoint of Assistant Sheriff George Barnett. At the end of each episode, Eugene W. Biscailuz, "the actual sheriff of Los Angeles County," summarized the segment.

Title
The title is an "emergency signal alerting officers to proceed to the destination with red light and siren and with all possible haste."

Cast

Richard Travis as Assistant Sheriff George Barnett
Christopher Dark as Sgt. Al Zavala (four episodes)
Denver Pyle as Sergeant Murchison
Fred Wynn as Lieutenant Bill Hollis

Guest stars

Claude Akins
Lola Albright
Don "Red" Barry
James Best
Whit Bissell
Paul Brinegar
Sally Brophy
Jean Byron
Mike Connors
Hans Conried
Russ Conway
Lloyd Corrigan
Walter Coy
Virginia Christine
Ted de Corsia
Richard Deacon
Francis De Sales
Bobby Diamond
Lawrence Dobkin
Ann Doran
John Doucette
Bill Erwin
Douglas Fowley
Dabbs Greer
Robert Griffin
James Griffith
Stacy Harris
Harry Harvey, Jr.
Susan Seaforth Hayes
Robert Horton
Vivi Janiss
Russell Johnson
DeForest Kelley
Ray Kellogg
Don Kennedy
Douglas Kennedy
Brett King
Helen Kleeb
Harry Lauter
Peter Leeds
Nan Leslie
Judi Meredith (as Judi Boutin)
Gregg Palmer
Jerry Paris
Paul Picerni
John M. Pickard
Richard Reeves
Paul Richards
Bing Russell
Dick Sargent
William Schallert
Richard Shannon
Kenneth Tobey
Herb Vigran
Eddie Waller
Beverly Washburn
Frank Wilcox
Guy Williams
Rhys Williams
Michael Winkelman
Grant Withers

Episodes

References

Further reading
 "Don Siegel Directs 'Code 3' Pilot". Hollywood Reporter. April 8, 1954. p. 7
 "TV-Films: ABC's 'Code 3' Deal". Variety. December 14, 1955, p. 39
 "Syndication for 'Code 3'". The Billboard. December 17, 1955. p. 8

External links 
 

First-run syndicated television programs in the United States
Black-and-white American television shows
1950s American crime drama television series
Television series by CBS Studios
1956 American television series debuts
1957 American television series endings